B&H Lifes is a Japanese pet product supplier, best known for its non-alcoholic drinks for cats and dogs.  The late 2013 launch of their "wine" for cats became an international story and was carried by cat and wine columns and magazines.  Only one thousand of the 180mL cat wine bottles were put on sale for the 2013 Christmas season, at 399 yen (US$4) each.

Products 
Dogs (Wan-Wan means woof-woof)
 Wan-Wan Sparkling Wine
 Wan-Wan Beer
 Wan-Wan energy drink
 Wan-Wan English Tea
Cats (Nyan Nyan means meow meow)
 Nyan Nyan Nouveau, or Meow Nouveau: "Nouveau" is a reference to the French wine Beaujolais nouveau, which is popular in Japan

References

External links
 

Japanese brands
Animal food manufacturers